Manuel Lepe Macedo (April 17, 1936 in Puerto Vallarta, Jalisco – September 9, 1984 in Guadalajara, Jalisco) was a Mexican artist who painted in a Naïve style. He painted mostly themes based on the landscape and townscape of his native Puerto Vallarta.

Lepe was never formally trained as an artist, and attended only four years of primary school. His paintings came to symbolize the town during the years that it was becoming popular as a resort.

Lepe became internationally known, with exhibitions of his work in several US museums and galleries. He was named Mexico's national artist by president Luis Echevarría Álvarez in 1979.

He died in 1984 in Guadalajara from a cerebral aneurysm. His workshop in Puerto Vallarta is preserved as a gallery and museum. Some of his works are on display there as well as at the Peter Gray Museum of Art on the Coastal Campus of the University of Guadalajara, north of Puerto Vallarta.

April 17 is celebrated in Puerto Vallarta as Manuel Lepe day.

References 

1984 deaths
1936 births
20th-century Mexican artists
20th-century Mexican male artists
20th-century Mexican painters
Artists from Jalisco
Mexican male painters
People from Puerto Vallarta